The 1976 NCAA men's volleyball tournament was the seventh annual tournament to determine the national champion of NCAA men's college volleyball. The tournament was played at Irving Gymnasium at Ball State University in Muncie, Indiana.

UCLA defeated Pepperdine in the final match, 3–0 (18–16, 15–9, 15–11), to win their sixth, and third consecutive, national title.

UCLA's Joe Mica was named Most Outstanding Player of the tournament. An All-tournament team of seven players was also named.

Qualification
Until the creation of the NCAA Men's Division III Volleyball Championship in 2012, there was only a single national championship for men's volleyball. As such, all NCAA men's volleyball programs (whether from Division I, Division II, or Division III) were eligible. A total of 4 teams were invited to contest this championship.

Tournament bracket 
Site: Irving Gymnasium, Muncie, Indiana

All tournament team 
Joe Mica, UCLA (Most outstanding player)
Marc Waldie, Ohio State
Dave Olbright, UCLA
Fred Sturm, UCLA
Denny Cline, UCLA
Ted Dodd, Pepperdine
Martin Nora, Pepperdine

See also 
 NCAA Men's National Collegiate Volleyball Championship

References

NCAA Men's Volleyball Tournament
NCAA Men's Volleyball Championship
NCAA Men's Volleyball Championship
Volleyball in Indiana
NCAA Men's Volleyball Championship
NCAA Men's Volleyball Championship